TigerSHARC refers to a family of microprocessors currently manufactured by Analog Devices Inc (ADI).

See also 
SHARC
Blackfin

External links 
TigerSHARC processor website

Digital signal processors
VLIW microprocessors